Wattia is a genus of parasitic flies in the family Tachinidae. There are at least three described species in Wattia.

Species
These three species belong to the genus Wattia:
 Wattia ferruginea Malloch, 1938
 Wattia petiolata Malloch, 1938
 Wattia sessilis Malloch, 1938

References

Further reading

 
 
 
 

Tachinidae
Articles created by Qbugbot